Shor Shoreh (also known as Shūr Shūr, Qal‘eh Shū Shūr, Qal‘eh-ye Shūr Shūr, and Shor Shor) is a village in Zhan Rural District, in the Central District of Dorud County, Lorestan Province, Iran. At the 2006 census, its population was 106, in 22 families.

References 

Towns and villages in Dorud County